is a former Japanese football player.

Playing career
Takeya was born in Kanagawa Prefecture on July 27, 1977. After graduating from Kokushikan University, he joined J2 League club Mito HollyHock in 2001. He debuted opening game in 2001 season on March 10. Although he played many matches as center back in 2001 season, HollyHock as finished at the 11 place of 12 clubs. He retired end of 2001 season.

Club statistics

References

External links

1977 births
Living people
Kokushikan University alumni
Association football people from Kanagawa Prefecture
Japanese footballers
J2 League players
Mito HollyHock players
Association football defenders